was a Japanese painter, who primarily painted in the Yōga ("Western painting") style.

Matsumoto was born on April 19, 1912, in Shibuya, Tokyo, as Shunsuke Satō (佐藤俊介). He spent his childhood and youth in northern Honshu, first in Hanamaki, Iwate, and later in Morioka, where he began attending middle school in 1925. The future sculptor Yasutake Funakoshi was among his schoolmates and in the same grade. Matsumoto contracted cerebrospinal meningitis which caused the loss of his hearing. Subsequently he developed an interest in becoming a painter, and left Morioka for Tokyo in 1929.

In 1935, he exhibited some of his works at the Fifth Nova Exhibition, and his work Buildings was accepted for the 22nd Nika Exhibition. He went on presenting his work at the Nika Exhibitions until 1943.

Matsumoto died at the age of 36 on June 8, 1948, from heart failure aggravated by tuberculosis and bronchial asthma.

Gallery

Notes

References
Mark H. Sandler : The Living Artist: Matsumoto Shunsuke's Reply to the State. Art Journal, Vol. 55, No. 3, Japan 1868-1945: Art, Architecture, and National Identity (Autumn, 1996), pp. 74–82

1912 births
1948 deaths
People from Shibuya
People from Hanamaki, Iwate
People from Morioka, Iwate
20th-century Japanese painters